Trouble the Saints is a 2020 historical fantasy novel by Alaya Dawn Johnson. It was first published by Tor Books/Macmillan Publishers.

Synopsis
In an alternate New York City in the early 1940s, Phyllis LeBlanc works for Victor the crime boss, passing for white as she uses her "saints' hands" — a supernatural skill with throwing knives — to kill people who Victor has told her are evil. When her boyfriend Dev Patil — who can magically foresee threats — tells her of upcoming dangers, they flee the city together, and their lives become much more complicated.

Reception
Trouble the Saints won the 2021 World Fantasy Award—Novel.

Kirkus Reviews praised it as a "nuanced portrait of racism in all of its poisonous flavors" which explores "the incredibly fraught, liminal space of being a light-skinned person of color", extolling Johnson's "musical prose" and "passionate and painful depictions of the love expressed in romance and friendship ". Publishers Weekly found it to "challenging [and] diverse", and a "literary firecracker" with "dynamic characters" and "style to spare", but faulted the plot as "overstuffed".

National Public Radio commended Johnson for transcending "the classic noir tale of an assassin desperate to be done with the life", but critiqued her portrayal of characters who were neither black nor white, asking "how much that part of their identity ([Victor's second-in-command] Walter is Native American and Dev is Indian) was being treated more as window dressing than being Black or white was, for Black and white characters."

Tor.com observed Johnson's choice to forego a "three-act narrative arc" despite having three viewpoint characters (including Tamara, who Phyllis and Dev meet later), noting that "what readers will anticipate is the crux of the story — Phyllis' relationship not only with her mob boss but with Dev" is in fact resolved at the end of the first part, with the rest of the novel being "all consequence and fallout, echoing with the reverberations of trauma". FIYAH considered it a "wonderfully rich blend of a vividly dangerous world, laced with magic in a vibrant presentation of historical reality", with "lyrical writing" and "characters [who] feel real and almost lovable", and recommended it to those who seek "heavily character-driven narrative laced with mysticism", but also described it as "imbalanced", with the viewpoints of Phyllis, Dev, and Tamara "not having the same effect throughout".

References

External links
The Trouble With “Non-White”: Passing, Power, and Complicity in Alaya Dawn Johnson’s Trouble the Saints, at Tor.com

Fantasy novels
World Fantasy Award for Best Novel-winning works